Coquitlam College is a private post-secondary degree-granting institution in Coquitlam, British Columbia. Established in 1982 and authorized by the British Columbia Ministry of Advanced Education to deliver post-secondary education in B.C. under the Degree Authorization Act  Coquitlam College offers the following programs:  a University Transfer Program, an Associate of Arts Degree Program, a Senior High School Program, and an English Studies Program.

Campuses
Coquitlam Main Campus - located within walking distance of the Lougheed Town Centre Skytrain station near the Burnaby/Coquitlam suburban border within Greater Vancouver.
Surrey Satellite Campus - located near the King George Skytrain station in the Surrey, British Columbia suburb of Greater Vancouver.

History
Coquitlam College was established in 1982 as an International college, initially offering senior high school and first- and second-year university studies, but formal English Studies courses were added in 1986.  In 1991, Coquitlam College was one of the first private colleges to be added to the BC Transfer Guide, an initiative overseen by the BCCAT to facilitate course credit transfer among post-secondary institutions.
In 2013 Coquitlam College was authorized to offer the Associate of Arts Degree
In 2018 the main Coquitlam campus was joined by a secondary campus in Surrey, British Columbia.

Coquitlam College is named after the suburb in which it is located.

See also
List of institutes and colleges in British Columbia
List of universities in British Columbia
Higher education in British Columbia
Education in Canada

References

External links
Official website

Colleges in British Columbia
Education in Coquitlam